James or Jim Clayton may refer to:

James Clayton (priest) (died 1588), English Roman Catholic priest
James Clayton (engineer) (1870s–1946), British railway locomotive engineer
Gordon Clayton (footballer, born 1910) (James Gordon Thomas Clayton), English footballer
Jim Clayton (rower) (1911–1992), New Zealand rower
Jim Clayton (Clayton Homes) (born 1934), American entrepreneur who founded Clayton Homes
Jim Clayton (musician) (born 1967), Canadian jazz musician
James Clayton (baritone), Australian baritone, see 12th Helpmann Awards